JP may refer to:

Arts and media

 JP (album), 2001, by American singer Jesse Powell
 Jp (magazine), an American Jeep magazine
 Jönköpings-Posten, a Swedish newspaper
 Judas Priest, an English heavy metal band
 Jurassic Park, an American media franchise
 Jyllands-Posten, a Danish newspaper

People

 JP (musician) (born 1984), American singer-songwriter
 Jayaprakash Narayan (1902–1979), Indian independence activist
 Jonathan Putra (born 1982), British–American actor and television host
 JP Karliak (born 1981), American actor, voice actor and comedian
 JP Sears (born 1981), American conservative YouTuber and comedian
 JP Tokoto (born 1993), American basketball player, now in Israel's premier league
J. P. Nadda (born 1960), Indian politician and lawyer
Jordan Peterson (born 1962), American clinical psychologist, author, and professor emeritus at the University of Toronto.

Places
 Japan (ISO 3166-1 country code: JP)
 Jamaica Plain, Massachusetts, neighborhood of Boston, U.S.

Political parties
 Janata Party, India
 Jubilee Party, Kenya
 Justice Party (South Korea)

Science and technology
 .jp, the Internet country-code top-level domain for Japan
 Jackson-Pratt drain, a surgical drain
 Military prefix for jet propellant fuels such as JP-4, JP-7, JP-8
 "JP", Formula 3 cars built by Joe Potts
 Julian Period

Other uses
 Justice of the peace, a judicial officer
 Adria Airways (IATA code: JP)

See also
 Jaypee (disambiguation)
 JPS (disambiguation)
 Jean-Pierre (disambiguation)
 Jean-Pierre (given name)